Lion's Head may refer to:
 Lion's Head (Cape Town), South African mountain
 Lion's Head, Ontario
 Lion's Head Provincial Park, a provincial park near Lion's Head, Ontario
 Lion's Head (food), a meatball and cabbage dish in Chinese Huaiyang cuisine
 Lion's Head (Benguet), a landmark in the Philippines along Kennon Road leading to Baguio City
 Lionshead, beer brewed by the Lion Brewery, Inc

See also
 Lionhead (disambiguation)
 Lion Rock